At a national level, Greece holds elections for its legislature, the Hellenic Parliament.

Election of the legislature

The Greek Parliament (Voulí ton Ellínon) has 300 members, elected for a four-year term by a system of 'reinforced' proportional representation. Of the 300 seats, 285 are allocated to 59 constituencies, 50 of which are multi-seat and 9 single-seat. The remaining 15 MPs are elected from nationwide party lists, of which 3 are required to represent the Greek diaspora. Seat allocation to individual parties is done on the basis of their nationwide vote share, provided they have reached the electoral threshold of 3%. In each constituency, voters may select the candidate or candidates of their choice by marking their name on the party ballot.

In 2016, the previous parliament, under a left-wing majority, abolished the reinforced proportionality system, which had been in effect since 2004. The previous system had been boosting the first party's seat count with 50 "bonus" seats, in order to facilitate single-party absolute majorities in parliament. It was replaced by a party-list proportional representation system, under which single-party parliamentary majorities, commonly achieved by first parties under previous electoral systems, could now only be achieved with a vote share of at least 45%, effectively making coalition governments the norm. On those grounds, and arguing that proportional representation would cause political instability, the new law was strongly contested by the conservative opposition and failed to get the two thirds supermajority required by the constitution for a new electoral system to be immediately applied in the next election. Hence, the previous system was still applied in the 2019 election, which the opposition won, whereas the new system will be applied in the next election for the first time.

In 2020, parliament, under its new conservative majority, repealed party-list proportional representation and reverted the system to a sliding scale majority bonus system. The new system is similar to the pre-2016 reinforced majority system, with the only difference that the size of the majority bonus is now tied to the largest party's national vote share, ranging from a minimum of 20 seats for a vote share of 25%  to a maximum of 50 seats for vote shares of 40% and above; no majority bonus is awarded to the first party if its vote share is below 25%. Under normal circumstances, an absolute majority can be achieved by the first party with 38% of the vote. However, as was the case with the proportional representation system voted by the previous parliament in 2016, the two thirds supermajority required by the constitution for a new electoral system to be immediately applied in the next election was not met, and, therefore, the new system will be applied to the election after next.

Greek citizens aged 17 and over on the year of the election are eligible to vote, and at the age of 25 and over are also eligible to be elected to Parliament. Women's suffrage was adopted in 1952.

Constituencies

Constituencies in Greece have traditionally been multi-seat, and they mostly coincide with prefectures. The number of seats is adjusted once every ten years, following the decennial population census. Prefecture constituencies may not be deprived of representation, nor may they be merged with another prefecture; they may however be split into smaller constituencies if their population increases disproportionately: this was the case with the Athens B constituency which was split into three smaller constituencies in 2019. Population changes have left nine (Kefalonia, Lefkas, Eurytania, Grevena, Samos, Thesprotia, Kastoria, Phocis and Zakynthos) prefectures with a single parliamentary seat each, whereas some urban or suburban constituencies have seen large increases in their seat allotment over the years.

Following the census of 2021, the largest constituencies can be found in the metropolitan areas of Athens and Thessaloniki. These are Athens B3 (19 seats), Thessaloniki A (17 seats), Athens B1 (16 seats), Athens A (13 seats), Athens B2 (12 seats) and East Attica (12 seats). The remaining constituencies elect single-digit numbers of MPs. The largest constituency outside Athens and Thessaloniki is Achaea which has 9 seats.

Voting
Polling takes place in school buildings on a Sunday, a festive occasion for students who are then given a four-day weekend off. The procedure is run by a presiding judge or attorney-at-law appointed by the local Bar association, and secretarially assisted by local citizens selected by lot in a process resembling jury duty. Local party representatives are allowed to monitor tallying; their theoretical role is to ensure transparency.

Police presence varies as police officers might be allocated to stand guard at an individual polling centre or supervise-that is, to patrol the general vicinity of-more than one polling centre (especially in the countryside). Up until 1998, the responsibility of guarding polling stations was shared between the Hellenic Armed Forces and the Hellenic Police, while there was no provision for laissez faire suprevision of multiple polling centres. During the 2019 European Parliament and local elections, police officers on guard received orders not to be armed only during the morning and afternoon shift of the day of the election, something in sharp contrast with past practices, while police unionists noted that the duty of guarding a polling centre should not fall on a single officer per shift. In 2021, the mention of the past presence of armed Hellenic Army soldiers in polling centres by a New Democracy MP in parliament was decried by Avgi.

Electoral system

The Greek electoral system was codified for the first time by Presidential Decree in 2012; prior to that date it was made up of various pieces of legislation passed at different times. The current system is called "reinforced proportionality" in Greece (ενισχυμένη αναλογική), and is a form of semi-proportional representation with a 50-seat majority bonus for the party that wins a plurality of the vote. There is also an electoral threshold of 3% which all parties and individuals need to pass on a national level before being awarded any seats. These provisions are aimed at helping the largest party secure an absolute majority of parliamentary seats (151 out of 300), enhancing governmental stability. The majority bonus of 50 seats was abolished in 2016, but was still applied at the 2019 Greek legislative election because the new electoral law did not receive a supermajority in Parliament, and can thus not be enforced in the next election.

The next election will see the electoral system change to proportional representation, as the majority bonus will cease to be applied since it was abolished in 2016. The election after next will revert to semi-proportional representation with a sliding scale bonus after it was passed in parliament in 2020.

The 50-seat majority bonus system was used for the first time in the May 2012 election; it reserves 50 parliamentary seats for the party emerges as the largest by total votes cast on a national level. The remaining 250 seats are divided proportionally in parliamentary constituencies according to each party's total valid vote percentage; this is slightly higher than the raw percentage reported, as there is always a small number of invalidated or "blank" votes (usually less than 1%), as well as the percentage of smaller parties that fail to surpass the 3% threshold, all of which are disregarded for the purpose of seat allotment. The previous law (used in the 2009 legislative elections) was less favorable for the plurality party, as only 40 additional seats were reserved for them.

Articles 99 and 100 of the codified electoral law lay out the way in which parties are allocated seats in accordance with the percentage of votes they received in a legislative election. The introduction of the majority bonus makes seat allocation especially complex, but the steps followed for the allocation of seats are as follows:

The number of seats a party is entitled to is first determined by dividing the total number of valid votes cast for parties which have surpassed the 3% national threshold and dividing it by 250 (99§2); this is later used to 'correct' the proportional results in the constituencies, ensuring that 50 seats always remain empty for the majority bonus.
The 12 seats elected through national-wide party-list are awarded by first determining a quota by taking the total number of valid votes for parties which have surpassed the 3% electoral threshold on a national level and dividing it by 12 (100§1). The total number of valid votes cast for each party is then divided by the quota, and the sum is rounded down, disregarding decimals, to produce the number of seats the party is awarded (100§2), so that a sum of 5.6 for example awards 5 seats to that party. If any of the 12 seats left empty in this step, a seat is awarded to each party in descending order of leftover decimals until all seats have been allocated in this manner (100§3).
The 7 seats elected through first-past-the-post in single-seat constituencies are awarded to the party which has the most votes in each of the constituencies in question, provided that that party has surpassed the 3% electoral threshold on a national level (100§5).
The 231 seats elected proportionally in constituencies are awarded by first determining a quota by taking the total number of valid votes cast for all parties in the constituency, regardless of if they have surpassed the 3% electoral threshold on a national level, and dividing it by the total number of seats in the constituency (100§4). The total number of valid votes cast for each party is then divided by the quota, and the rounded down sum corresponds to the number of seats each party is awarded in that constituency (100§4), so that again a sum of 5.6 would be awarded 5 seats. Any party which is entitled to more seats than it had candidates on the ballot paper can only be awarded a number of seats equal to the number of candidates it fielded (100§5). Any leftover seats are then awarded by calculating the difference between the total number of seats a party has received on a national level so far and the seats a party is entitled to according to the first step (100§6). The same procedure is then followed on all constituencies except single-member ones (100§6), to determine which constituencies each party is over- or under-represented in. This sum is used to award one seat, in descending order of sums, to that party which has the highest leftover sum in each of the two-member and three-member constituencies until all seats have been awarded (100§7). If any party has been awarded more seats on a national level than it is entitled to, the extra seats are removed from three-member (or, if necessary, two-member) constituencies in which that party has the lowest leftover sums (100§7). If there are still empty seats, those constituencies are ranked in descending order by leftover sums of parties which have surpassed the 3% electoral threshold on a national level, and one seat is awarded in each constituency to the smallest party by total number of valid votes above the 3% threshold, until that party has been awarded the total number of seats it is entitled to according to the first step (100§8). If there are still seats available, the last step is followed again and seats awarded to each party in ascending order of valid votes received, until all seats have been awarded.
The 50 seats of the majority bonus elected in constituencies are awarded after the above steps have been completed, ensuring that 50 seats remain available for the largest party (99§3a). A coalition can also be awarded the 50 seats provided that the average percentage of votes for each party in the coalition is larger than the percentage of votes received by the largest party on a national level, and in that case it is the Supreme Civil and Criminal Court of Greece that decides on whether a coalition qualifies for the allocation of the 50 seats (99§3b).

A rather complicated set of rules deals with rounding decimal results up or down, and ensures that the smaller a constituency is, the more strictly proportional its parliamentary representation will be. Another set of rules apportions the 50 seat premium for the largest-tallying party among constituencies.  Individual seats are apportioned by "cross of preference".  Voters mark a cross next to the name of the candidate or candidates they prefer, the number of crosses varying from one to five depending on constituency size.  Ballots with no crosses or more crosses than allowed, count for only the party but not the individual candidates.

Tallying is done manually in the presence of representatives of all contesting parties.  Party tallying, which is easier, is done first so that returns may be announced quickly.  Individual candidate tallying is done next and can take several days.  Once the number of seats per party and constituency is determined, the seats are filled on a top-down basis from the individual cross-of-preference tallies.  Party heads and acting or past Prime Ministers are exempt from cross-of-preference voting: they are automatically placed at the top of their party list and are elected, provided their party achieves at least one seat in the particular constituency.

By constitutional provision, the electoral law can be changed by simple parliamentary majority, but a law so changed comes into effect in the next-but-one election, unless a two-thirds parliamentary supermajority (200 or more votes) is achieved. Only in the latter case is the new electoral law effective at the next election.  A case in point is the current electoral law, which was passed in 2020.  Because this law was passed by a simple majority, it will not used for the subsequent 2023 election, but can be used in the 2027 election.

Electorate

All Greek citizens aged 17 or over in the year of the election are eligible to vote, provided they are on the electoral register, unless:
they are imprisoned for a criminal offence and they have been expressly deprived of the right to vote by judicial decision (this happens only in the rare cases of high treason or mutiny).  Incarcerated persons vote in polling stations specially set up inside prisons
they are mentally incapable of making a reasoned judgement, according to a judicial decision. In practice, this applies only to a percentage of institutionalised mental patients

According to Presidential Decree 26/2012(as amended by law 4648/2019), article 4, the 1st of January is-for electoral purposes-considered the birthday of all citizens turning 17 in that year. As such, citizens are able to vote in elections before their actual birthday, provided that they turn 17 in the year.

In the past, citizens who reached adulthood had to register and were issued an "election booklet" with which they voted.  Nowadays, registration for voters is not needed: it is done automatically each year by municipal authorities; catalogues of to-be voters (coming of age the next year) are composed during November of the previous year. They do not become part of electoral catalogues, till 1 January. Identity is proved by state-issued ID cards or passport.  Special registration is necessary only for absentee voting, which is done at the place of a voter's temporary residence on election day. Many Greeks choose to retain their voting rights in their family's original home, sometimes by reason of tradition, sometimes by reason of patronage.

Since the abolition of Electoral Booklets in 2001, each and every voter is provided with a 13-digit Special Electoral Number. This number is used solely for proving the uniqueness of the voter and excluding any possibility of double voting. Any other use of the number is deemed illegal and carries a penalty of at least a year in prison and fine from €2934.70 up to €29,347.03, unless other acts have taken place. 
This number consists of:
a four-digit code corresponding to a Municipality or Community(0101-Agia Varvara to 5410-Psara) 
the last three digits of the voter's birth year (999 for 1999, et cetera)
a five-digit code that reflects the ranking of each new voter,  in relation to his year of birth, which is unique per Municipality or Community and is allocated to the basis of first available number
a number (or letter) in relation to the aforementioned codes used for the verification of the correct registration of all the 12-digit sequence.
The Special Electoral Number remains the same, even if the voter chooses to transfer his voting rights to another constituency.

The Constitution provides, following the amendment of 2001, for the right of Greek citizens living abroad to vote for the legislative elections and the law implementing this constitutional provision was passed in 2019.

Compulsory voting is the law in Greece but is not enforced.  In the past a citizen had to present an up-to-date election booklet to be issued a driver licence or a passport, or else justify why they did not vote (e.g. because of absence, infirmity, or advanced old age).  Nowadays the civic duty of voting is still considered "mandatory" but there are no sanctions for failing to vote.

Turnout at national elections is low: a mere 56.6% at the 2015 election and 57.9% at the 2019 election.

Political culture 

Before 1910, Greece lacked a coherent party system in accordance with the traits of the modern representative democracy. The political formations of the 19th century lacked a steady organizational structure and a clear ideological orientation. Sometimes, they constituted just the incoherent and ephemeral escort of a prominent politician.

The first Greek parties with an ideological background, conforming to the modern conception of a political party, appeared after 1910, when Eleftherios Venizelos rose to predominance in Greek political life and founded his Liberal Party. The liberal wave of Venizelism resulted soon in the reaction of the "old-system" political leaders, who formed the core of an opposing conservative movement, which used the monarchy as its main rallying banner. Thereby, the two biggest ideological movements, the republican centrist-liberal and the monarchist conservative, emerged and formed massive political organizations.

The centrist and the conservative parties bitterly confronted each other in the ensuing legislative elections for many decades, until metapolitefsi. After the metapolitefsi of 1974, the leftist-socialist movement supplanted the centrists and took the main part of their electorate. A smaller part of erstwhile centrists, along with most conservatives, affiliated themselves with the centre-right New Democracy party, which self-defined as a liberal party and drafted the republican Constitution of 1975.

Until recently, Greece has had a two-party system dominated by the liberal-conservative New Democracy (ND) and the center-left Panhellenic Socialist Movement (PASOK). Other parties won far fewer seats. Beginning in the May and June 2012 legislative elections, SYRIZA (the Coalition of the Radical Left) overtook PASOK as the main force of the left wing. After almost three years of opposition to the ND-PASOK coalition government, SYRIZA took the most votes in the January 2015 elections and formed government, while PASOK just barely crossed the threshold.

Currently, the left is represented in Parliament by the Communist Party of Greece (KKE), SYRIZA, KINAL and MeRA25.To the right of ND, lies Kyriakos Velopoulos' Greek Solution.

2019 election

Election of the President of the Republic

The head of state – the President of the Hellenic Republic –  is elected by Parliament for a five-year term, and a maximum of two terms in office. Eligible for President is any person who:
 has had Greek citizenship for at least five years,
 has a father or a mother of Greek origin,
 is 40 years old or more,  
 is eligible to vote.
When a presidential term expires, Parliament votes to elect the new president. In the first two votes, a 2/3 majority (200 votes) is necessary. The third  vote requires a 3/5 (180 votes) majority. The fourth vote requires an absolute majority (151 votes). The fifth vote requires a plurality; in case of a split vote, the candidate who collected most votes in the first vote is elected president.

Before the 2019 constitutional amendment, if the third vote was fruitless, Parliament was dissolved and elections were proclaimed by the outgoing president within the next 30 days. In the new Parliament, the election for president was repeated immediately with a 3/5 majority required for the initial vote, an absolute majority (151 votes) for the second one and a ballot between the two persons with the highest number of votes in the second election for the third and final This occurred twice before the amendment of the provision for the dissolution of the parliament: in the 1990 and 2015 elections.

Elected presidents of the Third Hellenic Republic (1974–present)

European Parliament elections

Greece has had a delegation of Members of the European Parliament in the European Parliament since Greek accession to the EU in 1984. Originally, the Greek delegation numbered 25, but after 2004 that was reduced to 24 (due to the increase of the EU member countries). In 2009, it was further reduced to 22, and in 2014 to 21 MEPs.

Electoral system
In the European elections, the whole country forms a single constituency and an electoral threshold is set at 3% of the vote. Members of the government and elected members of the Hellenic Parliament may only stand for election after having resigned from office.

Until 2014, the MEPs were elected on the basis of a party-list proportional representation system. Starting with the 2014 European Parliament election, candidates are elected on the basis of individual preference votes with a maximum of four preferences per voter.

Latest election

Local elections
Local administration in Greece recently underwent extensive reform in two phases: the first phase, implemented in 1997 and commonly called the "Kapodistrias Project", consolidated the country's numerous municipalities and communities down to approximately 1000.  The second phase, initially called "Kapodistrias II" but eventually named the "Callicrates Project", was implemented in 2010; it further consolidated municipalities down to 370, and merged the country's 54 prefectures into 13 peripheries.  The Callicratean municipalities were designed according to several guidelines; for example each island (except Crete) was formed into a single municipality, while the majority of small towns were incorporated so as to have an average municipal population of 25,000.

The first prefectural elections took place in 1994; previously, prefects were executive appointees.  Municipal elections were held since the formation of the modern Greek state, in the early 19th century.

Local administrators elected in 2010, following the Callicrates reform, are to serve a "rump" 3.5-year term.  Starting in 2014, peripheral and municipal elections are to be held every five years, concurrently with elections for the European Parliament.  In all local elections, the winning candidacy list is guaranteed a minimum three-fifths majority in the respective councils.

Past local elections since 1974
1975 Greek local elections
1978 Greek local elections
1982 Greek local elections
1986 Greek local elections
1990 Greek local elections
1994 Greek local elections
1998 Greek local elections
2002 Greek local elections
2006 Greek local elections
2010 Greek local elections
2014 Greek local elections
2019 Greek local elections

Referendums
The current Constitution provides for two kinds of referendums:
 a referendum concerning a "passed law"
 a referendum concerning a matter of "national interest".

The latest referendum was indeed concerning a matter of "national interest", in contrast to all the previous ones that concerned the form of government, specifically regarding the Greek monarchy.

Previous referendums
There were 7 referendums in Greece from 1920 to 1974. All but one had to do with the form of government, namely retention/reestablishment or abolition of the monarchy. The 1974 referendum resulted in confirming of the parliamentary republic. The only referendum not concerning only the form of government was the constitutional referendum in 1968 held by the military junta. There were no referendums in Greece between 1974 and 2014. In 2015, the Greeks voted no on the bailout proposed by the ECB and IMF, which was however rejected by the government.

See also
 Politics of Greece

References

Further reading

External links
Parties and elections
Greek constituencies
NSD: European Election Database – Greece publishes regional level election data; allows for comparisons of election results, 1990–2009